Trans World Airlines Flight 106 was a scheduled passenger flight from Phoenix, Arizona to Chicago, Illinois, in the United States. On November 27, 1971, the Boeing 727 servicing the flight was hijacked by three armed and wanted men at Albuquerque International Sunport in Albuquerque, New Mexico, USA and flown to Havana, Cuba.

Aircraft and crew

The aircraft chosen for TWA Flight 106 on November 27 was a Boeing 727 with a registration of N854TW. The crew members of Flight 106 were all from Kansas City. They were Captain John B. McGhee, First Officer Robert M. Clark, and Flight Engineer John M. McFarland. The flight attendants were Diane Barrios, Elizabeth Caubre, and Shirley Ann Harrell. Forty-five passengers were aboard the aircraft.

Background
On November 8, 1971, 24 year old Ralph Goodwin of Berkeley, California, 20 year old Michael Albert Finney from Oakland, and 21 year old Charles Hill from Albuquerque, New Mexico; members of the Republic of New Afrika, a black separatist organization, were pulled over in a rented Ford Galaxie sedan, loaded with weapons for the organization, by New Mexico State Police Officer Robert Rosenbloom on Interstate 40 eight miles west of Albuquerque for a traffic violation. During the stop, one of the men shot and killed Officer Rosenbloom. The next day, the sedan was found abandoned, containing firearms and bomb materials. The three men were then subject to a statewide manhunt. Fearing reprisal at a time when capital punishment was still legal in New Mexico, the three men hid out in the desert for nineteen days, making plans for an escape while evading "250 law enforcement officers". According to Hill, “We had to go into exile so we [decided to hijack] a plane”. The three men initially planned to run to Africa.

On the morning of November 27, an Albuquerque business owner and wrecker driver, Vic Dugger, received a call for a disabled vehicle at a Southeast Heights residence. When he arrived at the address given to him, one of the three men were standing in the roadway waving his arms. The three men proceeded to hijack the wrecker with Dugger still inside with a .45 caliber pistol, and instructed him to drive them to the Sunport, and up to a TWA Boeing 727 parked on the tarmac, where they proceeded to hijack the aircraft. Dugger later identified the three hijackers as the suspects of Officer Rosenbloom's murder.

Hijacking
The hijackers boarded the aircraft where they confronted local resident and TWA employee Ronald Simpson. At one point, one of the men asked Simpson if he had "ever been to Cuba before". Simpson replied he had never been to Cuba, stating "There's a first time for everything". Simpson was refueling the plane at the time, so the hijackers allowed him to leave after he explained that he had to disconnect his refueling truck from the aircraft in order to take off.

The hijackers ordered Captain McGhee to fly to Havana, Cuba. They originally planned to fly to Africa with a refueling stop in Atlanta, Georgia, but when McGhee informed them the aircraft had insufficient range for an intercontinental flight, they decided to fly to Cuba instead. The aircraft landed in Tampa, Florida, where the passengers were allowed to leave. The aircraft was demanded to be refueled again, even though the hijackers were informed the plane had ample fuel for a round trip to Havana. The aircraft then took off with the hijackers and the six crew members aboard.

When the flight landed in Havana, those aboard were detained; the crew returned to the United States the next day
while Cuban Prime Minister Fidel Castro granted the hijackers political asylum.

Life in Cuba
Ralph Goodwin drowned in 1973, and Michael Finney died of throat cancer in 2005.

Charles Hill requested military training to fight with the revolutionaries in Africa, but his request was denied by the Cuban government. He was instead assigned work cutting sugarcane, doing construction, managing a clothing store, and other "menial jobs". One of his supervisors was Castro's brother Ramón Castro Ruz, who Hill remarked "was good to us, made sure we were always well fed.” Hill married twice in Cuba and has two children there. 

In 2015, Hill was interviewed by the press after two years of attempted contact while living in Cuba.

Hill's continued self-exile in Cuba has been cited as an obstacle to warming Cuba-United States relations.

See also
Delta Air Lines Flight 821
List of Cuba-United States aircraft hijackings

References

Aircraft hijackings in the United States
Aviation accidents and incidents in the United States in 1971
Trans World Airlines accidents and incidents
1971 in New Mexico
1971 in Cuba
Cuba–United States relations